Latifat Tijani (born 8 November 1981) is a Nigerian powerlifter. She won gold in the women's – 45kg event at the 2015 African Games in Brazzaville, Republic of Congo. In 2016, she competed in the women's – 45kg event at the 2016 Summer Paralympics, where she lifted 106kg to win silver.

At the 2019 World Para Powerlifting Championships she won the bronze medal in the women's 45 kg event.

References

1981 births
Living people
Olympic silver medalists for Nigeria
Medalists at the 2016 Summer Paralympics
Nigerian female weightlifters
Yoruba sportswomen
African Games gold medalists for Nigeria
African Games medalists in weightlifting
Competitors at the 2015 African Games
Paralympic medalists in powerlifting
Paralympic silver medalists for Nigeria
Powerlifters at the 2016 Summer Paralympics
Paralympic powerlifters of Nigeria
Nigerian powerlifters
Powerlifters at the 2020 Summer Paralympics
Medalists at the 2020 Summer Paralympics
21st-century Nigerian women
Powerlifters at the 2022 Commonwealth Games
Commonwealth Games competitors for Nigeria